Pucará District may refer to one of three districts in Peru:

 Pucará District, Huancayo
 Pucará District, Jaén
 Pucará District, Lampa